Faringdon  is a historic market town in the Vale of White Horse, Oxfordshire, England,  south-west of Oxford,  north-west of Wantage and  east-north-east of Swindon. It extends to the River Thames in the north; the highest ground is on the Ridgeway in the south. Faringdon was Berkshire's westernmost town until the 1974 boundary changes transferred its administration to Oxfordshire. The civil parish is formally known as Great Faringdon, to distinguish it from Little Faringdon in West Oxfordshire. The 2011 Census gave a population of 7,121; it was estimated at 7,992 in 2019. On 1 February 2004, Faringdon became the first place in south-east England to be awarded Fairtrade Town status.

History
The toponym "Faringdon" means "hill covered in fern". Claims, for example by P. J. Goodrich, that King Edward the Elder (reigned 899–924) died in Faringdon are unfounded. The town was granted a weekly market in 1218, and as a result came to be called Chipping Faringdon. A weekly outdoor market is still held on Tuesdays. King John established an abbey in Faringdon in 1202 (probably on the site of Portwell House), but it soon moved to Beaulieu in Hampshire. In 1417 the aged Archbishop of Dublin, Thomas Cranley, died in Faringdon while journeying to London.

Places of interest

All Saints' Church

The Church of England parish church of All Saints may date from the 12th century, and the clerestory and possibly the west end of the nave survive from this period. A Norman doorway survives, although not in its original position, in the baptistery. The chancel and north transept are 13th century and the west chapel is 14th century. The north chapel is a late medieval Perpendicular Gothic addition with 15th-century windows.

All Saints has a central bell tower, which was reduced in height in 1645 after it was damaged by a cannonball in the English Civil War. Faringdon was fought over because it commanded the road to the Radcot Bridge over the River Thames. The tower now has a ring of eight bells. The three oldest bells were cast in 1708. James Wells of Aldbourne, Wiltshire, cast the tenor bell in 1779 and another bell in 1803. The three youngest bells, including the treble, were cast in 1874 by Mears and Stainbank.

Local legend
The churchyard is said to be haunted by the headless ghost of a naval officer, Hampden Pye. Local legend has it that Pye was decapitated in a battlefield explosion while fighting in the War of the Spanish Succession, after being convinced to enlist by his mother, who sought to separate him from a local girl she considered an unsuitable match. An alternative legend states that Pye was an unfaithful husband who was decapitated by his wife with a gun. The ghost was reportedly exorcised shortly after Pye's death.

Old Town Hall
The Old Town Hall (once the Market Hall) in the Market Place dates from the 17th century. It is a Grade II* listed building.

Faringdon Folly
Just east of the town is Folly Hill or Faringdon Hill, a Greensand outcrop. In common with Badbury Hill to the west of the town, it has an ancient ditched defensive ring (hill fort). This was fortified by supporters of Matilda sometime during the Anarchy of 1135–1141, when she claimed the throne from King Stephen, but was soon defeated by him. Oliver Cromwell fortified it in an unsuccessful campaign to defeat the Royalist garrison at Faringdon House. The Pye family had Scots pines planted around the summit, around the time that Faringdon House was rebuilt in the late 18th century. The building is a conspicuous landmark from the Vale of White Horse, White Horse Hill, the Berkshire Downs near Lockinge, and the Cotswolds to the north-west.

The folly on Folly Hill was designed by Lord Gerald Wellesley, later 7th Duke of Wellington, for Lord Berners and built in 1935. It once bore a sign saying "Members of the public committing suicide from this tower do so at their own risk." During the Second World War the Home Guard used it as an observation post. In 1982 Robert Heber-Percy restored it and gave it to the town in trust. It has been a Grade II listed building since 1986. Near the top of London Street near Faringdon Folly is a pub bearing that name.

Faringdon House
There is a manor house and estate, close to the edge of Faringdon, called Faringdon House. The original house was damaged during the civil war. Its owner at the time, Sir Robert Pye, who was a Royalist, was put under siege by his own son Robert who was a Parliamentarian colonel. Building of the current, smaller, house began about 1780 and was not completed until after 1785. The house was bought in 1787 by William Hallett Esq. It was the home of Lord Berners in the mid-20th century. For a time it was owned by the writer Sofka Zinovieff, the granddaughter of Berners' companion, Robert Heber-Percy, who inherited it on Berners' death in 1950.

Geology

Faringdon is the site of the Faringdon Sponge Gravel Member, part of the Cretaceous Lower Greensand Group. It is rich in fossil sponges, other invertebrates, a few vertebrate bones and teeth, and good examples of bioerosion.

Transport

Roads
The £1.6-million  A420 Faringdon Bypass was opened in July 1979.

Buses
Faringdon is linked with Swindon and Oxford by a frequent service operated seven days a week by Stagecoach West, and by an hourly service to Wantage, run by Thames Travel and operating on Mondays to Saturdays.

Railway
A  Faringdon branch line was opened in 1864 between Faringdon and the Great Western Railway (GWR) at Uffington, with construction funded by the Faringdon Railway Company (bought outright by the GWR in 1886). Passenger traffic peaked in 1913, but later declined to an extent that the passenger service was withdrawn in 1951. Goods traffic continued until the Beeching closures of 1964. The Faringdon railway station building remains. It currently houses a nursery school.

Cultural pursuits
Faringdon is notable for the dyed pigeons at Faringdon House. The custom of dyeing pigeons was started by the eccentric Lord Berners. Around the town can be seen stone plaques with comments such as "Please do not throw stones at this notice", reflecting the ongoing influence of Berners. Since 2004, Faringdon has held an annual weekend festival known originally as the "Faringdon Arts Festival", now as "FollyFest". It is generally held as a non-profit event on the last summer weekend of the school year.

Notable residents
Mark Haskins (born 1988), an international professional wrestler who fights as the "Star Attraction", was brought up in Faringdon and has family in the town.
Rapper S1mba (Leonard Simbarashe Rwodzi, born 1999 in Zimbabwe) was brought up in Faringdon and has family in the town.

Nearby places

References

Sources

External links

Faringdon Community website
Faringdon Town Council

 
Market towns in Oxfordshire
Vale of White Horse